Margaret Gordon may refer to:

Margaret Gordon, Miss Alabama USA
Lady Margaret Gordon, wife of William Thomas Beckford
Margaret Gordon (actress) in The Flying Scot (film)
Maggie Gordon, character in The Last Starfighter 
 Margaret Harris Gordon, member of the Texas Legislature from 1939 to 1941
Margaret Gordon (illustrator)

See also
Margaret Gordon Burn, New Zealand teacher